Donald Robert Charles Quine (born September 11, 1938) is an American author, actor, and sports promoter. He is known for his television roles playing Joe Chernak and Stacey Grainger in Peyton Place and The Virginian. Quine also was the president of the Professional Karate Association (PKA) whose Kick of the 80’s weekly fight series on ESPN ran for close to a decade. He wrote American Karate, a book on self-defense.

Early life
Quine was born on September 11, 1938, in Fennville, Michigan, to Irene Elizabeth Quine (1916-2008) and Robert Corkill Quine (1895-1943).

After his father, a medical surgeon and major in the U.S. Air Force, was killed in the crash of a B-24 Liberator bomber near Gunnison, Colorado, on July 19, 1943, his mother entrusted Quine and his younger sister, Janis, into the care of Alec Dahlke, a carpenter, and his wife Evelyn, a schoolteacher, in Oxnard, California. Their daughters, Phyllis and Patty babysat the two siblings, giving Don's mother the opportunity to continue working as a dental assistant while staying at the home of a friend to save up money for a place to live with her two children.

Several years later, Quine's mother remarried, and he and his sister moved to northern California with their stepfather, James Gores, who was a steeplejack. Quine was valedictorian of his sixth grade class at Santa Fe Elementary in Oakland, California, a sergeant in the school Traffic Patrol and had two paper routes as a delivery boy for The Oakland Tribune. He bought the first TV set in his neighborhood, a 10" RCA, and charged kids a nickel a peek to watch Howdy Doody and Lone Ranger, until his stepfather put an end to the operation and explained to Don that capitalism has its limits.

His teenage years were troubled and Don spent several months at a juvenile detention center in Martinez, California, for burglary. After his mother divorced Gores and married an officer in the Coast Guard, Nathan Vanger, Don moved to Staten Island and graduated from New Dorp High School in 1957.

Acting career
After a semester of pre-medical studies at the University of Colorado, Don realized he did not want to be a doctor. While at Wagner College back in Staten Island, Don became involved in the Theatre Arts program. This led him to New York City where he studied at the American Theatre Wing with Stella Adler and John Stix, before landing the role of Tom Stark in Robert Penn Warren’s Off-Broadway premiere of All the King’s Men at the East 74th Street Theatre in 1959. It was here that he was spotted by an agent and offered work in Hollywood.

Filmography and television work

Torch Song (1993) as Joe (Movie)
Clayton County Line (1978) as deputy
Hawaii Five-O (1970) as Don Miles
Medical Center (1969) as Tim Martin
Lancer (1968) as Corey
Insight (1968) as Mike
The Virginian (1966–68) as Stacy Granger (55 episodes)
Peyton Place (1965–66) as Joe Chernak (16 episodes)
Sullivan's Empire (1967) as Kevin Sullivan (Movie)
The F.B.I. (1966) as Frank Collins
12 O'Clock High (1965–66) as Lt. Thourneau and Sergeant Hanson
The Fugitive (1964–66) as Joe

References

External links 
 
New York Times Professional Karate Association article
http://www.venturesnest.com
The Classic TV Archive
Sullivan’s Empire - IMDb
Clayton County Line - IMDb

1938 births
20th-century American male actors
21st-century American male writers
21st-century American novelists
21st-century American screenwriters
American male film actors
American male novelists
American male screenwriters
American male stage actors
American male television actors
American mystery writers
American science fiction writers
Balaban family
Living people
Male actors from Michigan
Novelists from New York (state)
People from New York City
Screenwriters from New York (state)